Bolttsia is a genus of crustaceans belonging to the monotypic family Bolttsiidae.

The species of this genus are found in Southern Africa and Australia.

Species:

Bolttsia minuta 
Bolttsia myersi

References

Amphipoda